Upper Ferntree Gully railway station is located on the Belgrave line in Victoria, Australia. It serves the eastern Melbourne suburb of Upper Ferntree Gully, and opened on 4 December 1889.

A number of services each day originate and terminate at Upper Ferntree Gully. The trains are stabled overnight in six of the seven sidings opposite the station.

History
Upper Ferntree Gully station opened on 4 December 1889, when the line from Ringwood was extended. After December 1900, it became the break-of-gauge station between the broad gauge used in most of Victoria, and the narrow gauge Gembrook line (now the Puffing Billy Railway), one of the five narrow gauge lines of the Victorian Railways. In 1954, the narrow gauge line was closed. However, the line as far as Belgrave was rebuilt as a broad gauge electrified railway, which opened on 18 February 1962.

In 1960, the current island platform and the stabling sidings to the north of the station were provided. In 1964, a signal panel was installed at the station. It controls the single-track line between Ferntree Gully and Belgrave. The station also monitors, via closed circuit television, all stations from Heathmont to Belgrave, and answers emergency calls from those stations.

On 4 August 1975, the name of the station was altered slightly to Upper Fern Tree Gully, although in more recent times most references have reverted to the original name. In 1978, a siding and a number of points and dwarf signals at the station were abolished.

In 1985, boom barriers were provided at the Hilltop Road level crossing, located nearby in the up direction of the station. On 2 July 1996, Upper Ferntree Gully was upgraded to a Premium Station.

Platforms and services
Upper Ferntree Gully has one island platform with two faces. It is served by Belgrave line trains.

Platform 1:
  all stations and limited express services to Flinders Street; all stations shuttle services to Ringwood

Platform 2:
  all stations services to Belgrave

Transport links
Ventura Bus Lines operates three routes via Upper Ferntree Gully station, under contract to Public Transport Victoria:
 : to Croydon station
 : Belgrave station – Oakleigh station
 : to Box Hill station

References

External links
 
 Melway map at street-directory.com.au

Premium Melbourne railway stations
Railway stations in Melbourne
Railway stations in Australia opened in 1889
Railway stations in the City of Knox